Mark Chaffey (born 6 May 1977) is a former Australian rules football player who played in the AFL between 1997 and 2006 for the Richmond Football Club.

See also
 List of Caulfield Grammar School people

External links
 
 

Living people
Richmond Football Club players
Australian rules footballers from Victoria (Australia)
People educated at Caulfield Grammar School
1977 births